The spotted wrasse, Anampses meleagrides, is a species of wrasse native to the Indian Ocean from the Red Sea and East Africa to the western Pacific Ocean to Samoa and the Tuamoto Islands and north to Japan. It is of minor importance to local commercial fisheries and can be found in the aquarium trade.

Common name 
Spotted wrasse,
Yellow tail tamarin

Habitat 
Salt water

Dispersion 
Andaman sea

Utilization 
Fishery: Small Trading, Aquarium: Trade

References

External links
marinespecies.org
 

Fish of Thailand
Spotted wrasse
Taxa named by Achille Valenciennes
Fish described in 1840